World Sensorium is a natural and inclusive world scent, a work of olfactory art by interdisciplinary artist Gayil Nalls, who is based in New York. A large-scale conceptual project and social sculpture, the world scent comprises the most culturally significant scents of 225 countries combined proportionally, according to the statistical population data of the year 2000. World Sensorium has been recognized by UNESCO and the President's Committee on the Arts and the Humanities as a global peace project and has been internationally exhibited in large public events, museums, and galleries since its creation in 1999.

The research for the creation of World Sensorium established smells from natural flora that triggered olfactory memory for the majority of people of each nation, with the goal of interpreting the relationship between world flora and human numbers on earth, and to bring new awareness of the living world and its influence on the human spirit and psyche. Through this work, Nalls has sought to foster an understanding of the larger evolutionary social construct of knowledge we share with others via the senses.

The project of World Sensorium can be categorized as a contribution to the genres of Olfactory Art and Aesthetics, Participatory art, and environmental art and functions along the trajectories of avant-garde and political or activist art.

Creative Inspiration

Berlin Wall
Nalls envisioned this concept for a “world scent” in 1989, eleven years prior to its completion and debut release. She describes the moment of inspiration for the formula as having occurred on December 28 of that year at the Brandenberg Gate, as the crowd pulled her on top of the Berlin Wall. As the connectivity passed through the bodies gathered, she envisioned a formula for World Sensorium where everyone would be counted.

Relationship to Permutatude Theory
World Sensorium was created for the aesthetic of mass anatomy to evoke global memory and to evolve a metabolic collective. Permutatude Theory and science form a significant background to the ongoing project, as do the processes of cultural transformation and globalization. As a theoretical construct, conceived to be an embodied consciousness of “one world” the olfactory sculpture critically engages individuals with their sense of smell, often in performative settings.

Methodology

Determination of ingredients
Historical scents of all the countries of the world, culturally significant in medicine, mythology, the arts, anthropology, spiritual practices, diet and memory were identified based on survey research to obtain quantitative information that supplied the raw data for the creation of the scent, establishing the constituent natural plant oils “from tree, flower, grass or herb”.  
	
Many of the plants were identified in local vernacular and required additional research to verify the Latin or English names. In some instances an English name did not exist.  “Nalls located botanical taxonomy scholars from the New York Botanical Garden and ethno-botanists from the National Tropical Botanical Garden in Hawaii to assist in properly identifying the botanical names” materials which had been referred to in colloquial terms such as, Senegal: Gowe (Cyperus articulatus), no English name, and American Samoa: Mos’oi (Cananga odorata), English name Ylang-ylang.

“The goal was to have to have each flora’s complex molecular compositions represented in its entirety so as to be perceived by humans as closely as it would if it were experienced in its habitat, in order to evoke the same psychological ad emotional responses, and neurological and immune functions as in the traditions of the culture.” To this end all raw materials were derived straight from botanical sources by means of distillation or extraction.

Formula
The composition of these ingredients was based on projected population percentages for each individual country for the year 2000. Everyone was counted.

Impact as World Peace Project

Global communications
In her quantitative research, Nalls crossed political boundaries in dialog with “countries the United States doesn’t get along with, such as Iran (rose), Iraq (date palm) Libya (orange blossom) and Cuba (tobacco).”

In some cases, communications spanned several months, but an especially “poignant moment in the creation of World Sensorium was the day the representative from the Israeli Embassy in Washington and the Palestinian representative from the united Nations called Nalls by phone within minutes of each other to report that their national choices were both the Olive tree because of its long revered association with peace.”

Recognition and Honors
In 1998, in recognition of Nalls’ outstanding creative achievement, World Sensorium was endorsed by the President's Committee on the Arts and Humanities and was granted sponsorship by the United Nations Educational, Scientific, and Cultural Organization (UNESCO) as an original cultural initiative building goodwill and peace in conjunction with the United Nation's International Year for Culture of Peace. In his letter to Nalls, Director-General, Dr. Federico Mayor, a brain biochemist, said that World Sensorium is a “highly original cultural initiative” that “will certainly contribute to creating a climate of goodwill and peace at this memorable moment in time” leading to “understanding and collaboration among nations”.

Cultural Significance

Olfactory Art and Aesthetics
With World Sensorium and more recent works, Nalls has advanced concepts of aesthetics to consider the olfactory sense over the historically privileged sense of vision. While the visual remains dominant, artists have and are now increasingly working with the sense of smell to produce emotionally and phenomenologically resonant works in the emergent genre of Olfactory Art. Nalls “like many other olfactory artists, uses only natural fragrances and essential oils. “I call it ‘rewilding the mind,’” she says.

Participatory Art
For Nalls, the connection between olfaction and social or participatory art is rooted in the evolutionary biology of the sense of smell. As the oldest sense, olfaction has the uncanny ability to trigger memory (individual and collective), and its significant role in chemosensory communication is critical to the collective action that is necessary for participatory social and art processes. 
		
World Sensorium is a participatory project in its all-inclusive ethos, Nalls’ intention for its en masse experience, and in its very creation which at times required to assistance of volunteers to gather the phytogenic materials.  “Randia aculeata an ingredient from the Netherlands 	Antilles, could only be found locally in Florida. A team was rushed to the site before Hurricane Lenny came in and swept through the area.” to harvest the leaves.

Avant-gardism and Political Art
In its use of extant culturally significant plant materials, Nalls advances the avant-garde notion that art should be brought closer to the praxis of life. World Sensorium is all-inclusive in its conception–a reflection of actual human-plant relations, making every experience of World Sensorium a connection to the world's collective ecology and human consciousness. When experienced en masse as in Times Square, Nalls initiated a collective metabolic experience, and introduced a universal language for cross-cultural efforts toward peace, by evoking our co-evolution with nature. Ken Johnson called World Sensorium a "utopian project" and "an olfactory metaphor for world unity" by an "earnest and rather grandiose conceptualist".

Exhibition History
 In 1997 Times Square Business Improvement District invited Nalls to premier World Sensorium at the Times Square Millennial celebration.
 On January 1, 2000 at midnight, thousands of silver squares embedded with this “fragrant symbol of unity,” "rained down" from surrounding buildings in New York at the millennial celebration “Times Square 2000: Crossroads of the World” over the heads millions of people. The 4½-inch rounded-square paperworks Nalls designed, have an inch-wide open flap where 10 grams of World Sensorium are microencapsulated.
 Simultaneously, Word Sensorium was presented at Millenium Around the World, The New Year's Eve celebration, co-hosted by President and Mrs. Clinton and Secretary of State Madeleine Albright, for the families of Washington's diplomatic community at the International Trade Center in the Ronald Reagan Building, organized by the GSA and the White House Millennium Council, Washington, DC.
 World Sensorium was next included in The Vatican's Jubilee of the Year 2000 and was featured in SacroSanto, for the month of May, 2000 at Sala 1, the Museum of Contemporary Art of Rome (MACRO), Italy.
 World Sensorium scent installation at Steffany Martz Gallery (New York, NY) in January 2000.
 In March 2002, a large World Sensorium exhibition and presentation was held at Ylvisaker Fine Arts Center, Bethany Lutheran College, Mankato, MN.
 In 2010 World Sensorium was installed as a lab for the event at Noć biologije (Biology Night), Zagreb University, Zagreb, Croatia, World Sensorium, curated by Dr. Julija Erhardt and students of the Neurophysiology department.
In 2010 there was a World Sensorium olfactory meditation session at Newhouse Center for Contemporary Art, Sailors' Snug Harbor. Staten Island, New York
 In 2011, World Sensorium was included in Objects of Devotion and Desire: Medieval Relic to Contemporary Art, The Bertha and Karl Leubsdorf Art Gallery, Hunter College, New York. (January 27- April 30), an exhibition organized around themes of Vision/Senses, Body/Death. Fragment/Composite, Photograph/Index and Time/Memory/Ritual, and included Medieval objects from The Metropolitan Museum and works from contemporary artists such as Christian Boltanski, Olafur Eliasson and Joseph Beuys, creator of the concept of Social sculpture.
 Also in 2011, Nalls was invited to participate in the Think Art: Memory Conference at Boston University, MA, where World Sensorium was shown in an accompanying exhibition, October 7–28.
 World Sensorium was next featured in Seeing Ourselves at The MUSECPMI Museum March 6 - April 14, 2012, along with Permutatude / Self, a self-portrait composed of a CAT scan (Computerized Axial Tomography) and a photograph taken in the early morning of January 1, 1990, after the fall of the Berlin Wall and New Year's Eve at the Brandenburg Gate.
In 2015, World Sensorium was shown at the exhibitions There’s Something in the Air at Museum Villa Rot and in Five Senses at Stary Browar in Poznań, Poland. Visitors were invited to self-apply and experience the work.

Additionally World Sensorium has been shown in group exhibitions in the United States, England, Sweden and Slovenia.

Notes and references

External links
 

Olfactory art
Visual arts exhibitions